Heroin Anonymous (HA) is a non-profit group founded in Phoenix, AZ in 2004 to help people addicted to heroin remain substance-free. Modeled after Alcoholics Anonymous, HA is a fellowship of people addicted to heroin who meet regularly to help each other practice complete abstinence from all drugs and alcohol. Heroin Anonymous does not provide drug counseling, medical or psychiatric treatment, or chemical dependency treatment. 

HA groups exist in 19 US states and the UK, including a meeting started in Phoenix, Arizona, in 2004. At HA meetings, members talk about their addiction, their difficulties, and their accomplishments. Members maintain anonymity by addressing one another with only first names. Alcoholics Anonymous is used as a guidebook. 

Heroin Anonymous is entirely self-supporting but charges no membership fees. They accept contributions from members, and they decline outside donations. They are not allied with any sect, denomination, politics, organization, or institution. HA's stated intention is to avoid controversy and endorsement or opposition to external causes. 

The first-ever Heroin Anonymous World Convention was held in Scottsdale, Arizona in 2014.  The second Heroin Anonymous World Convention was held in Portland, Oregon in 2018 to celebrate HA's 14th year of operation. The third Heroin Anonymous World Convention will be held in Atlanta, Georgia in 2020.

See also
 Narcotics Anonymous
 Cocaine Anonymous
 Methadone
 Suboxone
 List of twelve-step groups
 Recovery model
 Self-help groups for mental health
 Substance use disorder

References

External links
 

Addiction and substance abuse organizations
Twelve-step programs
Therapeutic community
Heroin
2004 establishments in Arizona
Organizations established in 2004